Malick Diop (born 24 August 1942) is a Senegalese sprinter. He competed in the men's 4 × 100 metres relay at the 1964 Summer Olympics.

References

1942 births
Living people
Athletes (track and field) at the 1964 Summer Olympics
Senegalese male sprinters
Olympic athletes of Senegal
Place of birth missing (living people)
African Games medalists in athletics (track and field)
African Games gold medalists for Senegal
Athletes (track and field) at the 1965 All-Africa Games